Chloroclystis cryptolopha is a moth in the family Geometridae. It is found in Tanzania.

References

External links

Moths described in 1932
cryptolopha
Insects of Tanzania
Moths of Africa
Endemic fauna of Tanzania